William Thomas Jennings (1854 – 6 February 1923) was a Liberal Party Member of Parliament in New Zealand.

Early life
He was born in Auckland, where he attended St. Paul's school and subsequently became an apprentice printer in the offices of the New Zealander. Subsequently, he worked for a number of newspapers: the Thames Guardian and the Dunedin Guardian as foreman, then the Dunedin Age and The Oamaru Mail as manager, followed by a move back to Auckland in 1882 to become foreman on the Evening Star.

Political career

A social reformer, he worked hard to represent men and women of the labouring classes and to improve their conditions. He was called to a seat in the New Zealand Legislative Council on 15 October 1892 as a representative of labour, and was known for his common sense, ability and courtesy. He also worked with the secretary of the New Zealand Tailoresses' Union to improve working conditions for women in that industry. He resigned from the Legislative Council on 23 October 1902, three years into his second term.

He stood for the Liberal Party and won the Egmont electorate in the 1902 general election, and held it to 1908. In 1908 he won the Taumarunui electorate but was defeated in 1911 general election. He won the electorate back in 1914, but on 14 May 1915 the election was declared void. He regained the electorate in the subsequent 1915 by-election and held it to 1919. In 1919 he won the Waitomo electorate but was defeated in 1922 general election.

His death in Wellington on 6 February 1923 was reported in The Argus (Melbourne).

Other positions held
He also held the following positions at various times in his life:
lieutenant in the Hobson Rifle Volunteer Corps
past district grand president of the order of Druids
honorary secretary to the Auckland Liberal Association
chairman of the Auckland Typographical Association

Notes

References

1854 births
1923 deaths
Members of the New Zealand Legislative Council
New Zealand Liberal Party MPs
New Zealand Liberal Party MLCs
Members of the New Zealand House of Representatives
New Zealand MPs for North Island electorates
Unsuccessful candidates in the 1911 New Zealand general election
Unsuccessful candidates in the 1922 New Zealand general election